Fjärdsjömåla AIF, FAIF, is a Swedish football club in Fjärdsjömåla, Karlskrona, Blekinge founded in 1949.

References

External links 
 faif.se

Football clubs in Blekinge County